The Tombo was a land registry compiled by the Portuguese to provide a detailed statement of property ownership and tax obligations in Portuguese Ceylon. First compiled in 1615, they are still sometimes used to settle land disputes.

See also
 List of loanwords in Sri Lankan Tamil
 Maral (tax)

References

External links
களஞ்சியம் 

Economic history of Sri Lanka
Portuguese Ceylon